Badma Nikolayevich Bashankayev (born 16 June 1978) is a Russian surgeon and politician.

Career 
Bashankayev was born in 1978 in Pyatigorsk. In 2002 he graduated from the First Moscow State Medical University. He is a surgeon by profession.

Politics 
He was a United Russia candidate in the 2021 Russian legislative election. He was elected to the State Duma in the Kalmykia constituency with 40.55 percent of the vote, replacing Marina Mukabenova who did not get re-nominated.

References 

Living people
1978 births
People from Pyatigorsk
Russian surgeons
United Russia politicians
Kalmyk people
Eighth convocation members of the State Duma (Russian Federation)
21st-century Russian politicians